Cırkənd is a village in the municipality of Bığır in the Goychay Rayon of Azerbaijan.

References

Populated places in Goychay District